Breguet or Bréguet may refer to: 

 Breguet (watch), watch manufacturer
Abraham-Louis Breguet (1747–1823), Swiss watchmaker
Louis-François-Clement Breguet (1804–1883), French physicist, watchmaker, electrical and telegraph work
 Bréguet Aviation, a defunct French aircraft manufacturer
Louis Charles Bréguet (1880–1955), French airplane designer
 Breguet School, now known as École supérieure d'ingénieurs en électronique et électrotechnique (ESIEE)